Dehu (also Romanized as Dehū, Dehau, and Dehoo; also known as Dahūr and Dehūr) is a village in Meyghan Rural District, in the Central District of Nehbandan County, South Khorasan Province, Iran. At the 2006 census, its population was 147, in 36 families.

References 

Populated places in Nehbandan County